Football at the 1924 Summer Olympics was the sixth edition of the football tournament at the 1924 Summer Olympics held in Paris.

The tournament expanded to 22 countries from 4 confederations, with African side Egypt (as the previous edition) and Turkey, Uruguay representing South America and the United States in representation of North America.

Uruguay made a memorable debut, winning the gold medal and finishing unbeaten.

Venues

Amateur status
In 1921, the Belgium Football Association first allowed for payments to players for time lost from work; in the months that followed four other Associations (Switzerland and Italy amongst them) permitted similar subsidies.  The Football Association, perhaps, with foresight considered their statement of 1884 to be one which FIFA should hereafter follow.  They had stated: "Any player registered with this Association ... receiving remuneration ... of any sort above ... necessary expenses actually paid, shall be considered to be a professional."

In 1923 the four British Associations sought an assurance that FIFA accept this definition; the four FIFA representatives on the International Football Association Board refused and, consequently, both the United Kingdom and Denmark withdrew their footballers from representing their nations at the 1924 Olympic Games.

Entries 

In Association Football (1960), Bernard Joy wrote about the 1912 Games that the authorities in Sweden "had debated for a long time whether to include football ... because its popularity was not yet world wide".  Twelve years later, in Paris, football had become so important to the Games that a 1/3 of the income generated came from football.  In terms of international development these Games signalled the first participation in a major Championship of a team from South America, a continent which would provide the main competition to Europe from that moment on.

In Paris, Uruguay, who had paid their third class passage to Paris and gone on a successful tour of Spain beforehand, would join as many as 18 European teams; the United States, Turkey and Egypt.

The Uruguayans had won the 1923 Sudamericano by maximum points in the December of the previous year to qualify for the tournament as their continent's sole participants; defeating rivals Argentina 2–0 in the final game in which Pedro Petrone scored halfway through the first half. Joy wrote: "A doctor and a physical expert were as important elements of the staff as the coach himself. They saw to it that their charges reached perfect physical condition.  They were kept that way by staying away from the attractions of Paris at a villa in the quiet village of Argenteuil". In Paris Jose Leandro Andrade would be dubbed La Merveille Noire. Despite this little was known about them; they had never played outside South America and their international experience had mainly been spent travelling across the harbour from Buenos Aires to Montevideo.

Italy, having remained unbeaten since 1922, found themselves beaten 4–0 by an early incantation of Hugo Meisl's Wunderteam (who would absent themselves from the Games).
With just six weeks to go before the Games Italy had been walloped 7–1 by Hungary.). Other than dropping Giampiero Combi, Vittorio Pozzo would not make major changes; Italy would not prevail. The same policy was adopted by Kingdom of SCS.  Rather than considering dropping players, they had sacked their manager Veljko Ugrinić instead (following a 4–1 defeat by those Austrians in Zagreb) but would find his replacement Todor Sekulić just as hapless.

The Hungarians had just come off a good run of results in the previous year, but had been beaten by the Swiss in the days leading up to the Games; Max Abegglen, who had only been playing international football for two years, scoring his 7th international goal that day for the Swiss.  The Swiss had been on the verge of withdrawing from the Games due to their continued success.  The team's train ticket was valid for only 10 days and their money had run out. An appeal by a newspaper, Sport, brought in the needed funds.

Entering for the second time Egypt caused a surprise defeat in their opening game. Both finalists from the previous Games were present; Belgium being afforded a bye into the first round; the Czechs drawn against Turkey in the preliminary round.

Final tournament 

The Games competition was assisted by a Preliminary Round which featured the silver-medallists from the 1920 Games, Spain in a game with Italy.  Since that time Spain had only lost once and that by a single goal away to Belgium and had drawn 0–0 with the Italians in March 1924. There was hardly anything between themselves and Italy when they met, this time, at the Colombes Stadium; Pedro Vallana's own goal handing victory to Italy.

Hungary put five past Poland, the Swiss sent Lithuania on their way, 9–0.  The Uruguayans played first-rate football, combining speed, skill and perfect ball-control.  By marrying short passing to intelligent positional play, they made the ball do all the work, and so kept their opponents on the run wrote Joy. The Uruguayans sailed past Kingdom of SCS by seven clear goals, then overcame the United States by three goals to nil.

In the first round Czechoslovakia (following their decision to walk off the field in 1920) faced Switzerland and the game went into extra-time.   One Czech was sent off, and the Norwegian referee had to call for order during a break.  For the replay, Abegllen took the captain's duties and all was different; Switzerland winning by the single goal.  Otherwise there were two surprises, the first went Egypt's way; 3–0 to the good against Hungary.  The second saw Sweden defeat the reigning gold-medallists, Belgium 8–1. Oscar Verbeeck's own goal set the Swedes on their way; Sven Rydell's hat-trick the feature of the match.  The Swedish outside-left Rudolf Kock (who would become chairman of the selectors in 1948 working alongside George Raynor), would have another fine game against Egypt where Sweden won 5–0.  France and Holland had been similarly dominant in the first round, but Uruguay beat France 5–1 to claim a semi-final place.

In another quarter-final Italy went out to Switzerland disputing a winner by Max Abegglen, who converted a break-away goal.  The Italians protested that he had been off-side.  The referee Johannes Mutters, refused to alter the decision of his linesman; a jury upheld the judgement.  There was further dispute in the semi-final where Holland (coached by the former Blackburn Rovers' player William Townley) took a first half lead against Uruguay through Feyenoord's Kees Pijl.  With twenty minutes to go Pedro Cea scored an equaliser and with less than ten Georges Vallat, the French referee, awarded Uruguay a penalty.  FIFA reported that "the Netherlands protested the ruling of a penalty kick that turned out to be the winning goal but then Uruguay protested against the Olympic Committee's selection of a Dutch referee for the final. To appease the South Americans, the committee pulled the name of a final referee out of a hat and picked out a Frenchman, Marcel Slawick". In the other semi-final between Switzerland and Sweden the Swiss prevailed.

In the final the Swiss were defeated by the Uruguayans whose two goals in the second half put paid to their opponent's ambitions, Uruguay eventually prevailing 3–0.  Interest in the final had been considerable, such was the draw of the Uruguayan side; 60,000 watched and 10,000 were locked out.

First round

Second round

Quarter-finals

Semi-finals

Bronze medal match

Gold medal match

Bracket

Final ranking

Medalists

Goalscorers 

7 goals

  Pedro Petrone (Uruguay)

6 goals

  Max Abegglen (Switzerland)

5 goals

  Kees Pijl (Netherlands)
  Sven Rydell (Sweden)
  Paul Sturzenegger (Switzerland)
  Héctor Scarone (Uruguay)

4 goals

  Pedro Cea (Uruguay)
  Putte Kock (Sweden)

3 goals

  Édouard Crut (France)
  Paul Nicolas (France)
  Ok Formenoy (Netherlands)
  Charles Brommesson (Sweden)
  Per Kaufeldt (Sweden)
  Ángel Romano (Uruguay)

2 goals

  Josef Sedláček (Czechoslovakia)
  Rudolf Sloup (Czechoslovakia)
  Ibrahim Yakan (Egypt)
  Jean Boyer (France)
  Giuseppe Della Valle (Italy)
  Walter Dietrich (Switzerland)
  Bekir Refet (Turkey)
  Ferenc Hirzer (Hungary)
  Zoltán Opata (Hungary)

1 goal

  Henri Larnoe (Belgium)
  Josef Čapek (Czechoslovakia)
  Jan Novák (Czechoslovakia)
  Hussein Hegazi (Egypt)
  József Eisenhoffer (Hungary)
  Paddy Duncan (Ireland)
  Frank Ghent (Ireland)
  Adolfo Baloncieri (Italy)
  André le Fèvre (Netherlands)
  Albert Hurgronje (Netherlands)
  Jan de Natris (Netherlands)
  Tore Keller (Sweden)
  Evert Lundqvist (Sweden)
  Robert Pache (Switzerland)
  Rudolf Ramseyer (Switzerland)
  Andy Straden (United States)
  José Vidal (Uruguay)

Own goals
  Pedro Vallana (Spain; playing against Italy)

Trivia
 Sweden, surprisingly, won Bronze. Their 8-1 defeat of the reigning champions, Belgium, in the opening round is still considered one of the biggest upsets in World football by criteria laid down by ELO.
 Some of the games took place at the Vélodrome de Vincennes.
 The lap of honour (or previously called "Olympic turn"), the celebration ritual that a champion team does after winning a tournament, was invented by the Uruguayan team after winning this Olympic title, as they wanted to salute those in attendance by running all around the athletics field.
 Uruguay's Pedro Petrone was two days shy of his 19th birthday when he accepted his gold medal; still the youngest football gold-medallist in the history of the Games.
 Future Chinese leader Deng Xiaoping was a worker in France at the time, in order to watch the final he pawned his coat.He mentioned his experience on this during an interview after his retirement.

References

 
1924
1924 Summer Olympics events
1924 in association football
1924
International association football competitions hosted by Paris
Olympics